Blake Ezor (born October 11, 1966) is a former professional football running back for the Denver Broncos of the National Football League.

References

1966 births
Living people
American football running backs
Michigan State Spartans football players
Denver Broncos players
Edmonton Elks players
Players of American football from Nevada
Sportspeople from Las Vegas
Bishop Gorman High School alumni